Cerignola: Also known as Bella di Cerignola, is an olive cultivar from Italy.

Cerignola olives are large in relation to other olive varieties, mild in flavor, and may be served either green or cured red or black. The variety, which originates from the south-eastern Italian province of Apulia and is named for the town of Cerignola, is popular as table olives.

Synonyms
Bella di Cerignola, Cerignolana and Cerignola Pendola.

References 

Olive cultivars
Olive